The Alpha Xi Delta Sorority Chapter House is a historic sorority house located at the University of Illinois at Urbana–Champaign in Urbana, Illinois. Built in 1915 as a private home, the house was purchased by the Kappa Chapter of the Alpha Xi Delta sorority in 1928. The chapter was formed in 1905 and rented houses until purchasing the house, which was near a developing sorority row east of the university campus. Architech Joseph W. Royer designed the house in the Tudor Revival style. The house's design features vertical half-timbering on the upper stories, decorative brickwork on the first floor, two steep cross gables and multiple dormers projecting from the roof, and multiple brick chimneys.

The house was added to the National Register of Historic Places on August 28, 1989.

References

Residential buildings on the National Register of Historic Places in Illinois
Tudor Revival architecture in Illinois
Residential buildings completed in 1915
National Register of Historic Places in Champaign County, Illinois
Buildings and structures of the University of Illinois Urbana-Champaign
Fraternity and sorority houses
University of Illinois Urbana-Champaign
History of women in Illinois
Alpha Xi Delta